The 1992–93 season was the 71st season of competitive association football and 64th season in the Football League played by York City Football Club, a professional football club based in York, North Yorkshire, England. They finished in fourth position in the 22-team 1992–93 Football League Third Division, qualifying for the play-offs. They were successful in the final, beating Crewe Alexandra in a penalty shoot-out to gain promotion to the Football League Second Division.

They lost in the first rounds in both the 1992–93 FA Cup and 1992–93 Football League Cup, being knocked out by Stockport County and Chesterfield respectively, and failed to progress past the preliminary round of the 1992–93 Football League Trophy.

20 players made at least one appearance in nationally organised first-team competition, and there were 11 different goalscorers. Defenders Wayne Hall and Andy McMillan and midfielder Jon McCarthy played in all 50 first-team matches over the season. Paul Barnes finished as leading goalscorer with 21 goals, all scored in the league. The winner of the Clubman of the Year award was Paul Stancliffe.

Match details

Football League Third Division

League table (part)

FA Cup

League Cup

Football League Trophy

Football League Third Division play-offs

Appearances and goals
Numbers in parentheses denote appearances as substitute.
Players with names struck through and marked  left the club during the playing season.
Players with names in italics and marked * were on loan from another club for the whole of their season with York.
Key to positions: GK – Goalkeeper; DF – Defender; MF – Midfielder; FW – Forward

See also
List of York City F.C. seasons

References
General

Source for kit: 
Source for match dates, league positions and results: 
Source for appearances, goalscorers and attendances: 
Source for player details: 

Specific

1992–93
1992–93 Football League Third Division by team
Foot